Kelpfish may refer to:

 Chironemus, the only genus in the family Chironemidae, commonly referred to as kelpfishes
 Large kelpfish (Chironemus marmoratus), commonly known as the kelpfish
 Gibbonsia, a genus of blennies from the family Clinidae, its members having the common name kelpfish
  Gibbonsia elegans, the spotted kelpfish
 Gibbonsia metzi, the striped kelpfish
 Gibbonsia montereyensis, the crevice kelpfish
 Giant kelpfish (Heterostichus rostratus), a species of blenny in the family Clinidae
 Sebastiscus marmoratus, the false kelpfish, a species of rockfish from the family Scorpaenidae 
 Oxyjulis californica, the señorita, a species of wrasse sometimes referred to as a type of kelpfish